Robert A. Collins (November 4, 1924 in Milwaukee, Wisconsin – January 4, 2003) was a member of the Wisconsin State Assembly. He attended St. Anthony High School, Solomon Juneau Business High School, Lawrence University, Marquette University and Marquette University Law School. During World War II, Collins served in the United States Army. He is a member of the American Legion.

Political career
Collins was elected to the Assembly in 1958. He was a Democrat.

References

Politicians from Milwaukee
Military personnel from Milwaukee
United States Army soldiers
United States Army personnel of World War II
Lawrence University alumni
Marquette University alumni
Marquette University Law School alumni
1924 births
2003 deaths
20th-century American politicians
Democratic Party members of the Wisconsin State Assembly